Julius Weingarten (2 March 1836 – 16 June 1910) was a German mathematician. He received his doctorate in 1864 from Martin-Luther-Universität Halle-Wittenberg.
He made some important contributions to the differential geometry of surfaces, such as the 
Weingarten equations.

Notes

References

External links

19th-century German mathematicians
1836 births
1910 deaths
20th-century German mathematicians
Academic staff of the Technical University of Berlin